Michael Thomas Brown (born September 8, 1975) is an American mixed martial arts trainer and former fighter who is the head MMA coach for American Top Team. As a mixed martial arts fighter, Brown was a former WEC Featherweight Champion and also competed in the Featherweight division of the UFC before retiring in 2014 to become a full-time MMA coach. He is the head coach of Dustin Poirier.

Background 
Brown wrestled at Bonny Eagle High School in Standish, Maine, where he won a state championship in 1992, his junior year. He went on to wrestle at Norwich University, where he was known for his ability to focus. Although he was an average student in high school, he was able to apply his focus to academics and excelled as a scholar-athlete in college.  According to Norwich wrestling coach Rich Hasenfus, Brown was one of the smartest athletes and strongest wrestlers at Norwich.

Mixed martial arts career

Early career 
Brown had fought in several MMA events including most recently WEC, where he was the Featherweight Champion. In 2005, Brown suffered a near career-ending loss at DEEP 22 in Japan. Brown's opponent, noted leg-lock expert Masakazu Imanari, dislocated Brown's leg to the point that his leg was pulled out and to the side of his knee joint. His only other Pre-WEC losses were to world-class fighters; besides Imanari, only Joe Lauzon, Genki Sudo, and Hermes Franca (all UFC veterans) had defeated Brown en route to Brown's 18–4 record.

World Extreme Cagefighting 
Riding a six-fight win streak, Mike Brown signed with the WEC's Featherweight division. His debut in the WEC was against Brazilian Jiu-jitsu expert Jeff Curran at WEC 34. In each round, Brown matched Curran's stand-up and then took him down and scored from the top with elbows and punches.  Brown won all three rounds en route to a unanimous decision victory.

Brown was then offered a shot at the WEC Featherweight Championship with a fight against Urijah Faber at WEC 36.  The fight was originally set to take place in Hollywood, Florida on September 10, 2008, but it was postponed to November 5, 2008, due to Hurricane Ike. At the time, Faber had held the title for over two and a half years and was widely considered to be the best fighter at 145 pounds in the world. Brown welcomed the opportunity to fight the best in the world and felt that his training with American Top Team had prepared him well. When the heavily-favored Faber attempted a risky elbow strike, Brown countered with a right hook to the jaw, knocking down the champion. Brown then followed with a flurry of unanswered punches and the fight was called off at 2:23 of the first round.  Brown won by technical knockout and was declared the new WEC featherweight champion.

Brown's first title defense came against Texas-native Leonard Garcia in Corpus Christi, Texas as the main event of WEC 39. Garcia came out very aggressively, but he made a mistake and circled in the wrong direction.  Brown capitalized on the mistake, knocking Garcia down with a big right hand.  He followed with a barrage of punches and elbows, one of which opened up a cut on Garcia's forehead. Brown took Garcia's back and worked unsuccessfully for a rear-naked choke. Garcia got Brown back in his guard, but Brown passed into a full mount and secured an arm-triangle choke.  Garcia tapped out at 1:57 of the first round. Brown said that he did not really feel like the champion after the Faber fight, but he was happy he established himself as the champion with his victory over Garcia.

Brown's second defense came in a rematch against former champ Urijah Faber as the main event of WEC 41: Brown vs. Faber 2.  The bout took place at ARCO Arena on June 7, 2009, in Sacramento, California.

Urijah Faber was defeated a second time by Brown via unanimous decision in front of his hometown crowd in Sacramento. The score cards read 49–46, 48–47 and 49–46, all in favor of Brown, solidifying him as the best Featherweight in the world. MMA websites Sherdog.com and ESPN.com both stated that "Faber's right hand was no match for the top of Mike Brown's head".

Following his unanimous Dec win over Faber (for the second time), Brown lost his WEC Featherweight Championship against José Aldo on November 18, 2009, at WEC 44. Brown lost by knockout in the second round.

Brown defeated WEC newcomer Anthony Morrison on January 10, 2010, at WEC 46 via first round submission.

Brown took on Manvel Gamburyan on April 24, 2010, at WEC 48.
Gamburyan defeated Brown via KO in the first round.

Mike Brown's next fight was against Cole Province at WEC 51. He won the fight via TKO (punches) in the first round.

Return to Ultimate Fighting Championship 
On October 28, 2010, World Extreme Cagefighting merged with the Ultimate Fighting Championship. As part of the merger, all WEC fighters were transferred to the UFC.

Brown first faced Diego Nunes on January 1, 2011, at UFC 125.  He lost the fight via split decision.

Brown jumped right back into action to face Rani Yahya on January 22, 2011, at UFC Fight Night 23, replacing an injured Chan Sung Jung.  He lost the fight via unanimous decision.

Brown was out until mid-2011 recovering from surgery on his hand that was injured during the Yahya bout.  On August 6, 2011, Brown faced Nam Phan at UFC 133.  He won the fight via unanimous decision, earning him his first UFC victory.

Brown was expected to face Vagner Rocha on January 20, 2012, at UFC on FX 1.  However, Brown was forced out of the bout with a knee injury.

Brown faced Daniel Pineda on May 26, 2012, at UFC 146. He defeated Pineda by unanimous decision.  In an interview with Ariel Helwani following the fight, Brown stated that he would give himself two weeks to consider retiring based on how his body felt after recovering.  On July 4, 2012, Brown signed a 5-fight deal with the UFC.

Brown was expected to face Akira Corassani on August 17, 2013, at UFC Fight Night 26.  However, Corassani pulled out of the bout and was replaced by Steven Siler. Brown lost the fight via knockout in the first round.

Brown was expected to face Estevan Payan on April 19, 2014, at UFC on Fox 11.  However, Brown was forced out of the bout with an injury and was replaced by promotional newcomer Alex White.

After pulling out of the fight against Payan, Brown said he would likely not fight again, though he did not say he was retiring.

Championships and accomplishments 
World Extreme Cagefighting
WEC Featherweight Championship (One time)
Two successful title defenses
Fight of the night (One time)
Knockout of the Night (One time)
Submission of the Night (One time)
Absolute Fighting Championships
AFC Featherweight Championship (One time)
CombatPress.com
2016 Coach of the Year
2017 Coach of the Year
2018 Coach of the Year
2019 Coach of the Year.
World MMA Awards
2018 The Shawn Tompkins Coach of the Year

Mixed martial arts record 

|-
|  Loss
| align=center| 26–9
| Steven Siler
| KO (punches)
| UFC Fight Night: Shogun vs. Sonnen
| 
| align=center| 1
| align=center| 0:50
| Boston, Massachusetts, United States
|
|-
|  Win
| align=center| 26–8
| Daniel Pineda
| Decision (unanimous)
| UFC 146
| 
| align=center| 3
| align=center| 5:00
| Las Vegas, Nevada, United States
|
|-
|  Win
| align=center| 25–8
| Nam Phan
| Decision (unanimous)
| UFC 133
| 
| align=center| 3
| align=center| 5:00
| Philadelphia, Pennsylvania, United States
|
|-
| Loss
| align=center| 24–8
| Rani Yahya
| Decision (unanimous)
| UFC: Fight for the Troops 2
| 
| align=center| 3
| align=center| 5:00
| Fort Hood, Texas, United States
|
|-
|  Loss
| align=center| 24–7
| Diego Nunes
| Decision (split)
| UFC 125
| 
| align=center| 3
| align=center| 5:00
| Las Vegas, Nevada, United States
|
|-
|  Win
| align=center| 24–6
| Cole Province
| TKO (punches)
| WEC 51
| 
| align=center| 1
| align=center| 1:18
| Broomfield, Colorado, United States
|
|-
|  Loss
| align=center| 23–6
| Manvel Gamburyan
| KO (punches)
| WEC 48
| 
| align=center| 1
| align=center| 2:22
| Sacramento, California, United States
|
|-
|  Win
| align=center| 23–5
| Anthony Morrison
| Submission (rear-naked choke)
| WEC 46
| 
| align=center| 1
| align=center| 1:54
| Sacramento, California, United States
|
|-
|  Loss
| align=center| 22–5
| José Aldo
| TKO (punches)
| WEC 44
| 
| align=center| 2
| align=center| 1:20
| Las Vegas, Nevada, United States
| 
|-
|  Win
| align=center| 22–4
| Urijah Faber
| Decision (unanimous)
| WEC 41
| 
| align=center| 5
| align=center| 5:00
| Sacramento, California, United States
| 
|-
|  Win
| align=center| 21–4
| Leonard Garcia
| Submission (arm-triangle choke)
| WEC 39
| 
| align=center| 1
| align=center| 1:57
| Corpus Christi, Texas, United States
| 
|-
| Win
| align=center| 20–4
| Urijah Faber
| TKO (punches)
| WEC 36: Faber vs. Brown
| 
| align=center| 1
| align=center| 2:23
| Hollywood, Florida, United States
| 
|-
| Win
| align=center| 19–4
| Jeff Curran
| Decision (unanimous)
| WEC 34: Faber vs. Pulver
| 
| align=center| 3
| align=center| 5:00
| Sacramento, California, United States
|
|-
| Win
| align=center| 18–4
| Manny Reyes Jr.
| Submission (rear-naked choke)
| PXF: Premier X-treme Fighting
| 
| align=center| 1
| align=center| 1:46
| Hollywood, Florida, United States
|
|-
| Win
| align=center| 17–4
| Eben Oroz
| TKO (punches)
| HOOKnSHOOT: BodogFIGHT
| 
| align=center| 1
| align=center| 3:15
| Evansville, Indiana, United States
|
|-
| Win
| align=center| 16–4
| Yves Edwards
| Decision (unanimous)
| BodogFIGHT: Clash of the Nations
| 
| align=center| 3
| align=center| 5:00
| Saint Petersburg, Russia
| 
|-
| Win
| align=center| 15–4
| Jason Bryant
| TKO (punches)
| AFC 19: Absolute Fighting Championships 19
| 
| align=center| 1
| align=center| 1:26
| Boca Raton, Florida, United States
|
|-
| Win
| align=center| 14–4
| Rocky Long
| Submission (rear-naked choke)
| KE: Kick Enterprises
| 
| align=center| 2
| align=center| 1:32
| Fort Myers, Florida, United States
|
|-
| Win
| align=center| 13–4
| Dustin Neace
| Submission (guillotine choke)
| AFC 18: Absolute Fighting Championships 18
| 
| align=center| 1
| align=center| 0:50
| Boca Raton, Florida, United States
|
|-
| Loss
| align=center| 12–4
| Masakazu Imanari
| Technical Submission (rolling kneelock)
| DEEP: 22 Impact
| 
| align=center| 2
| align=center| 3:38
| Tokyo, Japan
| 
|-
| Win
| align=center| 12–3
| Takeshi Yamazaki
| Decision (unanimous)
| DEEP: 21st Impact
| 
| align=center| 3
| align=center| 5:00
| Tokyo, Japan
| 
|-
| Win
| align=center| 11–3
| Taiyo Nakahara
| Submission (arm-triangle choke)
| GCM: D.O.G. 2
| 
| align=center| 2
| align=center| N/A
| Tokyo, Japan
|
|-
| Win
| align=center| 10–3
| Renato Tavares
| Decision (unanimous)
| AFC 10: Absolute Fighting Championships 10
| 
| align=center| 3
| align=center| 5:00
| Ft. Lauderdale, Florida, United States
| 
|-
| Loss
| align=center| 9–3
| Joe Lauzon
| Submission (rear-naked choke)
| CZ 8: Street Justice
| 
| align=center| 3
| align=center| 2:14
| Revere, Massachusetts, United States
| 
|-
| Loss
| align=center| 9–2
| Genki Sudo
| Submission (triangle armbar)
| UFC 47
| 
| align=center| 1
| align=center| 3:31
| Las Vegas, Nevada, United States
| 
|-
| Win
| align=center| 9–1
| Leigh Remedios
| Decision (unanimous)
| AFC 6: Absolute Fighting Championships 6
| 
| align=center| 3
| align=center| 5:00
| Ft. Lauderdale, Florida, United States
| 
|-
| Win
| align=center| 8–1
| Renat Mirzabekov
| Submission (heel hook)
| HFC 2: Hardcore Fighting Championships 2
| 
| align=center| 1
| align=center| 2:38
| Revere, Massachusetts, United States
|
|-
| Win
| align=center| 7–1
| Mark Hominick
| Submission (heel hook)
| TFC 8: Hell Raiser
| 
| align=center| 3
| align=center| N/A
| Toledo, Ohio, United States
|
|-
| Win
| align=center| 6–1
| Shawn Graham
| TKO (punches)
| HFC 1: Hardcore Fighting Championships 1
| 
| align=center| 2
| align=center| 1:05
| Revere, Massachusetts, United States
|
|-
| Win
| align=center| 5–1
| Mike Large
| Submission (rear-naked choke)
| TFC 7: Fightzone 7
| 
| align=center| 1
| align=center| N/A
| Toledo, Ohio, United States
|
|-
| Win
| align=center| 4–1
| Bill Mahoney
| Submission (rear-naked choke)
| MD 10: Mass Destruction 10
| 
| align=center| 3
| align=center| N/A
| Swansea, Massachusetts, United States
|
|-
| Win
| align=center| 3–1
| Edward Odquina
| Submission (rear-naked choke)
| USMMA 1: Ring of Fury
| 
| align=center| 1
| align=center| N/A
| Lowell, Massachusetts, United States
|
|-
| Loss
| align=center| 2–1
| Hermes França
| Submission (triangle choke)
| HOOKnSHOOT: Kings 1
| 
| align=center| 1
| align=center| 2:21
| Evansville, Indiana, United States
| 
|-
| Win
| align=center| 2–0
| Vinny Brightman
| Submission (rear-naked choke)
| MD3: Mass Destruction 3
| 
| align=center| 1
| align=center| 3:30
| Swansea, Massachusetts, United States
|
|-
| Win
| align=center| 1–0
| Jeff Darienzo
| Submission (americana)
| MD1: Mass Destruction 1
| 
| align=center| 1
| align=center| 2:15
| Swansea, Massachusetts, United States
|
|-

See also 
 List of male mixed martial artists

References

External links 

Official UFC Profile

Official Myspace

American male mixed martial artists
Mixed martial artists from Maine
Featherweight mixed martial artists
Mixed martial artists utilizing collegiate wrestling
Mixed martial artists utilizing Brazilian jiu-jitsu
World Extreme Cagefighting champions
1975 births
Living people
American practitioners of Brazilian jiu-jitsu
People awarded a black belt in Brazilian jiu-jitsu
Sportspeople from Portland, Maine
People from Standish, Maine
Norwich University alumni
People from Coconut Creek, Florida
Ultimate Fighting Championship male fighters
American male sport wrestlers